UAAP Season 56 is the 1993–1994 season of the University Athletic Association of the Philippines, which was hosted by the Far Eastern University.

It was the coverage by Silverstar Sports aired on New Vision 9 channel 9.

Men's basketball
The University of Santo Tomas (UST) Growling Tigers, headed by a young Dennis Espino swept the elimination round to clinch their first championship since 1967. The Final Four format was supposed to be in its first year of application but since the rules stipulated that once a team wins all of their elimination round games, the postseason is scrapped and that team is declared the automatic champion.

Elimination round

UST's sweep

References